Bledius is a genus of spiny-legged rove beetles in the family Staphylinidae. There are at least 100 described species in Bledius.

See also
 List of Bledius species

References

Further reading

External links
  Cheng, L. (Ed.). (1976). Marine insects. North-Holland Publishing Company: Amsterdam, The Netherlands. XII, 581 pp. 
 Frank, H.; Ahn, K.-J. (2011). Coastal Staphylinidae (Coleoptera): A worldwide checklist, biogeography and natural history. ZooKeys. 107: 1-98

Oxytelinae